Mosquera is a Spanish surname (first name) originally from Galicia (Spain). The family crest states (Spanish) Gallego. It derives from the mansion of the family's founder, Ramiro de Mosquera. In the fifth century, it was already linked to Moscoso, one of Galicia's oldest notable families. Mosquera spread around Galicia, Las Castillas, Extremadura and America. In Galicia, one of the oldest houses was in Coto de Villar de Payo Muniz, a dos leguas from Ourense. Another existed at villa de Vilariño de Conso.

Etymology

According to etymologists, the name Mosquera is an allusion to a place where the greatest quantity of "aces" grows, and derives itself from the word "moscon", which originally referred to a type of tree.

Family 

Part of the family settled in Portugal where the name changed to "Mosqueira". The following names are in the lists of the Order of Carlos III: Gabriel Mosquera and Luis Mosquera y Julián Mosquera.

Antonio Mosquera was born in Spain and was a soldier in the War of Flanders and governor of Puerto Rico. He went to Chile with a thousand men, and arrived at Santiago on October 6, 1605.

Geographical distribution
As of 2014, 68.6% of all known bearers of the surname Mosquera were residents of Colombia (frequency 1:264), 8.7% of Ecuador (1:689), 7.0% of Venezuela (1:1,635), 4.5% of Spain (1:3,950), 2.7% of the Philippines (1:14,325), 1.9% of Peru (1:6,421), 1.8% of Panama (1:820), 1.4% of Argentina (1:11,512) and 1.2% of the United States (1:111,635).

In Spain, the frequency of the surname was higher than national average (1:3,950) only in one autonomous community: Galicia (1:409).

In Colombia, the frequency of the surname was higher than national average (1:264) in the following departments:
 Chocó Department (1:10)
 Cauca Department (1:83)
 Valle del Cauca Department (1:101)
 Guaviare Department (1:169)
 Huila Department (1:234)
 Risaralda Department (1:257)

Notables
 Aquivaldo Mosquera (born 1981), Colombian football player
 Aurelio Mosquera (1883-1939), Ecuadorian president
 Edwin Mosquera (weightlifter) (born 1985), Colombian weightlifter 
 Ezequiel Mosquera (born 1975), Spanish professional cyclist
 Jesús Mosquera (born 1993), Spanish actor
 Joaquín Mosquera (1787-1878), Colombian president
 John Jairo Mosquera (born 1988), Colombian football player
 Josimar Mosquera (born 1982), Colombian football player
 Luis Antonio Valencia Mosquera (born 1985), Ecuadorian football player
 Luis Javier Mosquera (born 1995), Colombian weightlifter
 Mabel Mosquera (born 1969), Colombian weightlifter
 Máximo Mosquera (1928-2016), Peruvian footballer
 Óscar Albeiro Figueroa Mosquera (born 1983), Colombian weightlifter, Olympic champion
 Pedro Mosquera (born 1988), Spanish footballer
 Tomás Cipriano de Mosquera (1798-1878), Colombian president
 Yohn Geiller Mosquera (born 1989), Colombian football player

Toponyms 
 Mosquera, Cundinamarca, municipality in Colombia
 Mosquera, Nariño, municipality in Colombia

See also

 Mosqueira, a rarer variant

References

Surnames
Galician-language surnames